Popa is a community council located in the Mokhotlong District of Lesotho. Its population in 2006 was 6,725.

Villages
The community of Popa includes the villages of Botsola, Ha Koatake, Ha Konki, Ha Lesoeja, Ha Letaba, Ha Letjama, Ha Mathibeli, Ha Nyoko, Ha Phohla, Ha Ramohale, Ha Tipi, Ha Tšese, Kanana, Kheseng, Khohlong, Lilimala, Lisaleng, Litšoeneng, Mabekong, Mabeleteng, Mabothong, Maitisi, Majakaneng, Makalong, Makaoteng, Makhalong, Makhomalong, Maqaseng, Masholoko, Matlobong, Matsoapong, Moeaneng, Moreneng, Paballong, Phokeng, Pontšeng, Sebothoane, Sekokong, Tlokoeng, Tsekong and Tšila-Ntšo.

References

External links
 Google map of community villages

Populated places in Mokhotlong District